Matrupuri is a holy place located at Easternmost point of Risida in the Kalahandi district of Odisha, India.   Coordinates of Matrupuri are [20°23'20"N 83°28'57"E]. It means 'the Abode of The Mother'. The place has been named after The Mother of Sri Aurobindo Ashram, in Pondicherry. This holy place was developed in Risida, 1968 amidst beautiful natural surroundings of hills (Bhaludunguri and Adendunguri). Matrupuri is the brain child of Sri Madhusudan Mishra, now in Sri Aurobindo Ashram. The organisation is run by the devotees of The Mother, namely, Sri Maheswar Rana, Sri Rajib Lochan Rana, Sri Indramani Rana and others with the blessings of The Mother.

Matrupuri is managed and run by Matrupuri Karyalaya, a registered society which runs a school, Sri Aurobindo Integral Education Centre. There is a proposal to set up an Institute of Higher Education and a National Library. Regular programmes are organised in the premises of Matrupuri Karyalaya.

Hamlet named Matrupuri has been developed nearby the Matrupuri Karyalaya. Matrupuri is the seat of J K Mahavidyalaya College, Jagannath Degree College and Ed. Care Public School of Risida.

Villages in Kalahandi district